Jasmine Guy (born March 10, 1962) is an American actress, director, singer and dancer. She is known for her role as Dina in the 1988 film School Daze and as Whitley Gilbert-Wayne on the NBC The Cosby Show spin-off A Different World, which originally ran from 1987 to 1993. Guy won four consecutive NAACP Image Awards from 1990 through 1993 for Outstanding Lead Actress in a Comedy Series for her role on the show. She played Roxy Harvey on Dead Like Me and as Sheila "Grams" Bennet on The Vampire Diaries. More recently, she played the role of Gemma, Richard Webber’s friend and potential love interest on Grey's Anatomy.

Early life
Born in Boston, Massachusetts, to a Black American father and Caucasian mother, Guy was raised in the affluent historic Collier Heights neighborhood of Atlanta, Georgia, where she attended Northside Performing Arts High School. Her mother, the former Jaye Rudolph, was a former high-school teacher, and her father, the Reverend William Vincent Guy, was pastor of the historic Friendship Baptist Church of Atlanta, which served as an early home to Spelman College; he was also a college instructor in philosophy and religion. At the age of 17, she moved to New York City to study dance at the Alvin Ailey American Dance Center.

Acting career

Television roles
Guy began her television career with a non-speaking role, as a dancer, in seven episodes of the 1982 television series Fame under the direction of choreographer Debbie Allen.

Guy today remains best known for her starring role as Whitley Gilbert in the television sitcom A Different World. A spin-off of The Cosby Show and created by Bill Cosby himself, the show aired from 1987 to 1993 on NBC. Guy wrote three episodes of the show and directed one, in addition to appearing in every episode: she started as a co-star, but ended up replacing the show's original star Lisa Bonet, who left the series. Guy was nominated for and won six consecutive NAACP Image Awards for Outstanding Lead Actress in a Comedy Series.

In addition to her defining role on A Different World, she appeared in a 1991 episode of The Fresh Prince of Bel-Air as Kayla, one of Will Smith's girlfriends. In 1992, Guy appeared in CBS's Stompin' at the Savoy alongside Vanessa Williams, again under the direction of Debbie Allen, and in 1993, she played the mother of Halle Berry's character in the CBS TV mini-series Queen. This was based on Alex Haley's book Queen: The Story of an American Family, a companion volume to his earlier Roots: The Saga of an American Family, which itself had been converted to a television mini-series. In 1995, Guy appeared as Peter Burns' love interest, Caitlin Mills, on two episodes of Melrose Place, and in 1996, she appeared on Living Single, playing a psychologist treating main character Khadijah for anxiety. She also played the recurring role of Kathleen, a fallen angel, in the CBS Network drama Touched by an Angel from 1995 to 1997. In 2002, Guy lent her voice to the PBS math-based animated series Cyberchase, playing Ava, the queen of the cybersite Symmetria, and made a cameo appearance on the Moesha spin-off The Parkers. In 2003, Guy played Mary Estes Peters in the HBO documentary, Unchained Memories: Readings from the Slave Narrative, a documentary which premiered during Black History Month. The slave narratives were based on the WPA slave interviews conducted during the 1930s with over 2,000 former slaves.

Guy starred alongside Ellen Muth and Mandy Patinkin in the series Dead Like Me, created by Bryan Fuller. The show ran 29 episodes over two seasons, in 2003 and 2004, on Showtime. Guy played Roxy Harvey, a meter maid turned police officer and one of the core group of grim reapers around which the series was based. Guy was nominated for the 2005 NAACP Image Award for Outstanding Supporting Actress in a Drama Series for the role. She later starred in the feature-length series sequel Dead Like Me: Life After Death, which was released on video in 2009 before being shown on the Syfy channel. In 2009, Guy performed in The People Speak, a documentary that used dramatic and musical performances of the letters, diaries, and speeches of everyday Americans, based on historian Howard Zinn's A People's History of the United States. A broad look at civil rights issues in America, The People Speak was executive produced by and seen on The History Channel. In 2010, she was seen in the second season of the Lifetime comedy series Drop Dead Diva as a judge in the episode titled "Last Year's Model," and from 2009 to 2017, Guy had a recurring role in The CW's series The Vampire Diaries. In that program, Guy played Sheila "Grams" Bennett, the grandmother of Bonnie (Katerina Graham), who proved to be a descendant of Salem Witches. Both shows were filmed in the Atlanta area. In late 2017, she appeared in the Lifetime Christmas movie Secret Santa.

Film roles
Guy made her film debut in 1988 in Spike Lee's musical-drama film School Daze. She played the role of Dina, a member of the light-skinned, straight-haired African American women of Gamma Ray, a women's auxiliary to the Gamma Phi Gamma fraternity. Filming on School Daze was completed before she joined the cast of A Different World. During the following year, she appeared as Dominique La Rue in Harlem Nights starring Eddie Murphy (who also directed), Richard Pryor, and Redd Foxx. In 1997, she provided the voice of Sawyer in the Warner Bros. animated film Cats Don't Dance. In 2011, she appeared in the film October Baby.  In 2015, she appeared in the film Big Stone Gap with Ashley Judd, Patrick Wilson, Jenna Elfman, Anthony LaPaglia, Jane Krakowski, and Whoopi Goldberg. She starred in the short film My Nephew Emmett, which won the Student Academy Award and was nominated for the Academy Award for Best Live Action Short Film in 2018.

Stage
In 1987, Guy had a starring role in the off-Broadway hit musical Beehive, before traveling to France to appear in a similar musical review. Guy has performed in several Broadway productions and national tours, including as Crow in The Wiz, Mickey in Leader of the Pack, Betty Rizzo in Grease, and as Velma Kelly in Chicago. On April 6, 2009, Playbill reported on Guy's return to the stage, starring in the True Colors Theatre Company production of Pearl Cleage's Blues for an Alabama Sky. Directed by Andrea Frye, the show was a last minute addition to the company's season and opened May 4 in Atlanta. Blues came on the heels of Guy's held-over run in True Colors' Miss Evers' Boys, which co-starred TC Carson of Living Single.

Guy directed the world premiere of I Dream in July 2010 on the Alliance Stage of the Woodruff Arts Centre in Atlanta. Also in 2010, Guy was a member of the cast of the Alabama Shakespeare Festival and the Alliance Theatre Company co-production of Pearl Cleage's The Nacirema Society Requests the Honor of Your Presence at a Celebration of Their First One-Hundred Years. The production ran September 24 through October 3 at the Festival in Montgomery, Alabama, before moving to Atlanta's Alliance Theatre for performances October 20 through November 14. In early 2011, Guy directed George C. Wolfe's The Colored Museum for True Colors, and in June 2011, Guy costarred with Kenny Leon in their production of Sam Shepard's play Fool For Love at The Balzer Theater at Herren's in Atlanta, Georgia. In August 2010, Guy had joined Kenny Leon's True Colors Theatre Company in an off stage role as the company's Producing Director. In announcing the hire, True Colors said Guy's full-time position would be both administrative and artistic, and both local and national. Guy continues to contribute to the company on stage as well.

Music career
During the run of A Different World, Guy released her self-titled debut album in 1990. The album peaked at No. 143 on the US Top 200 Album Chart and spawned three hit singles: "Try Me" (US R&B No. 14); "Another Like My Lover" (US No. 66, US R&B No. 9); and "Just Want to Hold You" (US No. 34, US R&B No. 27), with the last single cracking the main US Top 40 singles chart.

Personal life
Guy had a close friendship with rapper Tupac Shakur. They met during his guest appearance on the sitcom A Different World in 1993. Shakur recuperated at Guy's home after he was shot in 1994. Guy appeared in his music video "Temptations" and later wrote his mother's biography, Afeni Shakur: Evolution of a Revolutionary.

Guy married Terrence Duckett in August 1998, and the couple had one child, a daughter named Imani, born in 1999. On April 8, 2008, People reported that Guy and Duckett were divorcing after ten years of marriage due to irreconcilable differences. Guy and her daughter subsequently took up residence in Guy's childhood hometown of Atlanta.

Guy endorsed Senator Bernie Sanders for President in the 2016 U.S. presidential election.

Filmography

Film

Television

Discography

Albums
 Jasmine Guy (1990)

Singles
 "Try Me" (1990)
 "Another Like My Lover" (1991)
 "Just Want to Hold You" (1991)
 "Don't Want Money" (1991)

References

External links
 
 
 

1962 births
20th-century American singers
21st-century American singers
20th-century American actresses
21st-century American actresses
20th-century African-American women singers
American people of Portuguese descent
American contemporary R&B singers
New jack swing musicians
Living people
Actresses from Atlanta
Actresses from Boston
African-American actresses
American television actresses
American voice actresses
American stage actresses
American film actresses
20th-century American women singers
21st-century American women singers
21st-century African-American women singers
Massachusetts Democrats
Georgia (U.S. state) Democrats